Variable nebulae are reflection nebulae that change in brightness because of changes in their star.

See also
McNeil's Nebula
NGC 1555 (Hind's Variable Nebula)
NGC 2261 (Hubble's Variable Nebula) 
NGC 6729 (R Coronae Australis Nebula)

References

External links
 Astrobiscuit: Seeing The Speed Of Light fun and educational video about variable nebula and the amateur community observing them

Nebulae